Novaya Shlyapina is a rural locality (a village) in Oshibskoye Rural Settlement, Kudymkarsky District, Perm Krai, Russia. The population was 46 as of 2010.

Geography 
Novaya Shlyapina is located 43 km northeast of Kudymkar (the district's administrative centre) by road. Staraya Shlyapina is the nearest rural locality.

References 

Rural localities in Kudymkarsky District